Michela Suppo (born 20 September 1971) is an Italian sports shooter. She competed at the 1992 Summer Olympics and the 1996 Summer Olympics.

References

1971 births
Living people
Italian female sport shooters
Olympic shooters of Italy
Shooters at the 1992 Summer Olympics
Shooters at the 1996 Summer Olympics
Sportspeople from Turin